Kassim al-Rimawi (11 January 1918 – 29 April 1982) was a Jordanian politician and statesman who served as the 25th Prime Minister of Jordan from 3 July 1980 to 28 August 1980. He was born in Beit Rima under Occupied Enemy Territory Administration.

 28 January 1962 to 13 October 1962 - Minister of Agriculture and Construction.
 2 December 1962 to 27 March 1963 - Minister of Agriculture.
 31 July 1965 to 23 December 1966 - Minister of Interior and urban and rural affairs.
 22 December 1966 to 4 March 1967 - Minister of Interior and urban and rural affairs.
 27 June to 15 September 1970 - Minister of Interior and urban and rural affairs.
 19 December 1979 to 3 July 1980 - Minister of Agriculture.

He was the Speaker of the House of Representatives of Jordan from 1967 to 1970.

Education 
 Doctorate in economics and education from Columbia University in New York in 1956
 Master's degree from the same university in 1954 (he was a professor at this university in 1953 for Management Sciences and Social Affairs)
 Bachelor's degree in sociology from the American University in Cairo in 1952
 Intermediate Certificate in Law from the University of London

See also 
 List of prime ministers of Jordan

External links
 Prime Ministry of Jordan website

References

1918 births
1982 deaths
Columbia University alumni
Arab people in Mandatory Palestine
The American University in Cairo alumni
Alumni of the University of London
Palestinian politicians
Prime Ministers of Jordan
Government ministers of Jordan
Agriculture ministers of Jordan
Construction ministers of Jordan
Interior ministers of Jordan
Municipal affairs ministers of Jordan
Defence ministers of Jordan
Members of the House of Representatives (Jordan)
Speakers of the House of Representatives (Jordan)
Jordanian people of Palestinian descent

People from Bani Zeid al-Gharbia
Members of the Executive Committee of the Palestine Liberation Organization